Juan Manuel Osorio Ortiz (born June 24, 1957, in Toluca de Lerdo, Mexico) is a Mexican telenovela producer.

Filmography

Theater 
Aristemo el Musical (2019)
 Aventurera (2017)
 Mi corazón es tuyo (2015)

Awards and nominations

Premios TVyNovelas

Premios People en Español

TV Adicto Golden Awards

References

External links

1957 births
Living people
Mexican television directors
Mexican telenovela producers
People from Mérida, Yucatán